The United States of America is the only studio album by American rock band the United States of America. Produced by David Rubinson, it was released in 1968 by Columbia Records. The album combined rock and electronic instrumentation, experimental composition, and lyrics reflecting leftist political themes.

The United States of America received positive reviews on its release and charted at number 181 on the Billboard 200. The album has been reissued several times and continues to receive critical acclaim decades after its original release.

Production
The United States of America was produced by David Rubinson, who also signed the group to Columbia Records. Rubinson previously knew members Joseph Byrd and Dorothy Moskowitz. Creating the electronic sounds on the album was difficult because of the technical limitations. Byrd recalled "the only available functioning keyable synthesizers were Robert Moog's at +$20,000. We were left with whatever sounds I could squeeze from three variable wave shape generators, modulating one another." The oscillators were built for the group by Richard Durrett. Electronic devices were used live and on the album to process other instruments and Moskowitz's voice. Towards the end of the song "The American Metaphysical Circus", for instance, her vocals are distorted to the point of being almost unintelligible.

Music

Style
Joseph Byrd, the band's leader, stated that his aesthetic aim for the band and album was to create avant-garde, political rock music; he envisioned that their music would combine electronic sounds (not electronic music), musical and political radicalism, and performance art. During the 1960s, Byrd was drawn to the leftist Communist Party group, explaining that it was "the one group that had discipline, an agenda, and was willing to work within the existing institutions to educate and radicalize American society." The song "Love Song for the Dead Ché" reflects these ideas. Columbia Records originally wanted the song's title changed due to its political implications. Byrd suggested "Julius and Ethel Rosenberg" as a replacement title if the original title had not been used.

The album is littered with references to Byrd's obsession with old-time American music, such as the Dixieland jazz intro on "I Won't Leave My Wooden Wife for You, Sugar". "The American Metaphysical Circus" starts out with no fewer than five layers of sound being heard in a collage, including a calliope playing "National Emblem", a ragtime piano playing "At a Georgia Camp Meeting", and two marching bands playing "Marching Through Georgia" and "The Red, White and Blue" switching between left and right channels. The other two tracks are of electronic sounds.

Lyrics
Dorothy Moskowitz and Joseph Byrd collaborated as lyricists on the album for most of the songs. On "The Garden of Earthly Delights", Ed Bogas wrote the lyrics for the first verse and chorus, while Moskowitz came up with the track's title and other tuneful changes and accents. On "Coming Down", Moskowitz contributed the melody line and lyrics for the second and third verses. On "Hard Coming Love", Byrd wrote the title and first verse, and Moskowitz contributed to what she referred to as the "lame doggerel that follows".

Release

The United States of America was released in 1968 by Columbia Records. The album spent nine weeks on the Billboard albums chart in the United States, peaking at number 181 in May 1968. It failed to chart in the United Kingdom. Arguments between Byrd and the rest of his bandmates about the band's direction led the band to split up within months of the album's release.

The United States of America was reissued on compact disc by Columbia in 1992 with two bonus tracks. In 1997, the album was reissued in the United Kingdom by Edsel Records. On July 13, 2004, Sundazed Records reissued the album on vinyl and CD with a new album cover differing from the cover used for the original UK and Europe releases, and with the CD version containing 10 bonus tracks Joseph Byrd claims to have had little input on the Sundazed reissue of the album. Byrd says he had been "interested in doing notes, and I figured this was a chance to get my voice heard – Dorothy and Rubinson had both done extensive interviews referring to me in unpleasant fashion (as justification for their coup, I imagine). I asked for $300 and got it. I've written elsewhere to you that Sundazed took out all references they found controversial, including one about Bill Graham."

Reception

The United States of America was originally released to minimal press. "The tunes are infectious, the harmonies adventurous yet eminently satisfying. And the lyrics (which Columbia has wisely printed on the jacket) are the best thing of all", wrote Barret Hansen in his 1968 review for Rolling Stone. He nonetheless found that the album "falls short of being really satisfying" due to the band's musicianship being "not quite on a level with their ideas", noting: "The voices are flat and uninteresting, showing little technical or interpretive power. The instruments perform their assigned tasks adroitly, but all too mechanically."

Modern reception of the album has been very positive. Richie Unterberger of AllMusic deemed it "one of the most exciting and experimental psychedelic albums of the late 1960s" and compared some of the band's more hard-edged material to early Pink Floyd and the Velvet Underground. He concluded: "Occasionally things get too excessive and self-conscious, and the attempts at comedy are a bit flat, but otherwise this is a near classic." "The most ambitious, idiosyncratic debut album of 2004 is 36 years old," opened Mark Hamilton's review of the 2004 reissue for Dusted Magazine. Pitchforks Cameron Macdonald said that the album "still stands above the work of most of their Monterey-era, psych-rock peers", despite the presence of some dated electronic effects typical of "many electro-acoustic pieces from the analog years." It is included in the book 1001 Albums You Must Hear Before You Die. Classic Rock Magazine cited it as one of the "16 Best Psychedelic Rock Albums".

Track listing

Personnel
The United States of America
 Joseph Byrd – electronic music, electric harpsichord, organ, calliope, piano, vocals
 Dorothy Moskowitz – lead vocals
 Gordon Marron – electric violin, ring modulator, vocals (on "Where Is Yesterday" and "Stranded in Time")
 Rand Forbes – electric bass
 Craig Woodson – electric drums, percussion

Additional musicians
 Ed Bogas – occasional organ, piano, calliope
 Don Ellis – trumpet (on "I Won't Leave My Wooden Wife for You, Sugar")

Technical staff
 Glen Kolotkin – remixing
 Arthur Kendy – remixing
 Richard Durrett – instrument design engineering
 David Diller – engineering
 David Rubinson – production

Charts

Release history

Notes

References

External links
  Discogs listing of album formats
 Brief excerpt from promo film for "Coming Down"

1968 debut albums
The United States of America (band) albums
Joseph Byrd albums
Albums produced by Dave Rubinson
Columbia Records albums
Sundazed Records albums